Asadabad (also Romanized as Asadābād) is a village in Posht Rud Rural District, in the Central District of Narmashir County, Kerman Province, Iran. At the 2006 census, its population was 734, in 181 families.

References 

Populated places in Narmashir County